Igor Viktorovich Lavrov (born 4 June 1973) is a Russian team handball player and Olympic champion from 2000 in Sydney.

References

1973 births
Living people
Russian male handball players
Olympic handball players of Russia
Handball players at the 1996 Summer Olympics
Handball players at the 2000 Summer Olympics
Olympic gold medalists for Russia
Sportspeople from Stavropol
Olympic medalists in handball
Medalists at the 2000 Summer Olympics